Kentucky Route 632 (KY 632) is a  state highway in Pike County, Kentucky, that runs from Kentucky Route 194 at Kimper to KY 194 again in Phelps.

Major intersections

References

0632
Transportation in Pike County, Kentucky